Noel Ernest Money,  (17 March 1867 – 30 May 1941) was a brigadier-general in the British Army during the First World War.

Born in Canada but then educated and residing in England, Money first served in a militia infantry battalion. Then transferred to a regular infantry battalion, before resigning and joining the Shropshire Yeomanry. He served in the Second Boer War and the First World War, being invested as a Companion of the Order of St Michael and St George and the Distinguished Service Order and bar, for a second award.

In later life he returned to Canada becoming a hotelier and golf course owner. He was also the President of his local board of trade.

History

Early life
Noel Ernest Money was born in Montreal Canada on 17 March 1867. The eldest son of Captain Albert William Money of the Royal Canadian Rifle Regiment. The family moved to Weybridge, in England and Money was educated at Radley College, and Christ Church, Oxford University.

In May 1886 he became a militia officer in the 3rd Battalion Royal Welsh Fusiliers. In November 1888, as a regular army officer, he transferred to the Royal Irish Fusiliers, with the rank of second-lieutenant. Then in October 1891, the then Lieutenant Money resigned his regular commission. However, on 29 December 1899, he joined the yeomanry as a second-lieutenant in the Shropshire Yeomanry, and was thus able to volunteer for service in the Second Boer War.

Second Boer War
The following year he was seconded for service with the Imperial Yeomanry, serving in the 13th (Shropshire) company of the 5th Battalion, where he was appointed a Lieutenant on 3 February 1900. The company left Liverpool the same day, and arrived in Cape Town the following month. In South Africa he fought in the Transvaal and Cape Colony, in the battles at Venterskroon (7 and 9 August); the action at Lindley (1 July) and Rhenoster River. He also served with the South African Constabulary. During the war he was slightly wounded, and was promoted to temporary rank of captain on 20 October 1900, mentioned in dispatches, and invested as a Companion of the Distinguished Service Order. He also received the two campaign medals, the Queen's South Africa Medal with three clasps, and the King's South Africa Medal with two clasps.

Between wars
In April 1902 he was promoted to lieutenant in the Shropshire Yeomanry, but for his service in South Africa retained the honorary rank of captain in the army. In November 1902, having up to now been a supernumerary officer, he was signed onto the establishment of the Shropshire Yeomanry. In 1903, Money married Maud Boileau, the second daughter of Edward Wood, of Culmington Manor, Shropshire, a High Sheriff of Shropshire. Together they had a son Gordon and daughter Mary. Remaining in the yeomanry he was promoted to captain in April 1906, and major in November 1913.

Before that he had visited Canada, for a fishing trip to northern Ontario and Vancouver Island, where he purchased six lots of land at Qualicum Beach, intending to build a hotel. In February 1914, Money and his family arrived at Qualicum Beach, and he became the managing director of the Merchants Trust and Trading Company Limited and the Qualicum Water Company Limited.

First World War
Prior to the start of the war, in 1908, the Shropshire Yeomanry was assigned to the Welsh Border Mounted Brigade a constituent of the Territorial Force. A year after the start of the war Money, returned to England and rejoined his regiment. The regiment remained in England until March 1916, when together with the brigade sailed for Egypt. When they arrived the brigade amalgamated with the South Wales Mounted Brigade, to form the 4th Dismounted Brigade. In September 1916, he was promoted to temporary lieutenant-colonel and given command of the Royal Gloucestershire Hussars and two companies of a Territorial Force battalion from the Royal West Kent Regiment then in 1917, Money was awarded a bar, to signify a second award, to the Distinguished Service Order. In February 1918, he was promoted to temporary brigadier-general to command the 159th (Cheshire) Brigade, in the 53rd (Welsh) Division, which under his command captured the Mount of Olives at Jerusalem.

Post war
In December 1918, Money was invested as a Companion of the Order of St Michael and St George, then, in June 1919, he relinquished his temporary rank of brigadier-general, returning to his substantive rank of major, and returned to Qualicum Beach. However, for his service, the following December, he was granted the honorary rank of brigadier-general.

Later life
In the early 1920s he purchased the Qualicum Beach Hotel and the nearby Qualicum Beach Golf Club. The hotel during this time had several noted guests, including amongst others; Bob Hope, Bing Crosby, Errol Flynn, Shirley Temple, Spencer Tracy and each Governor General of Canada. From November 1929 to November 1936, Money served as president of the Qualicum Board of Trade.

General Money died, aged 74, on 30 May 1941 and was buried in the graveyard of St Mark's Anglican Church, Qualicum Beach, British Columbia.

References

Sources

1867 births
1941 deaths
British Army generals
People educated at Radley College
Alumni of Christ Church, Oxford
Royal Gloucestershire Hussars officers
Shropshire Yeomanry officers
Imperial Yeomanry officers
Companions of the Distinguished Service Order
Companions of the Order of St Michael and St George
British military personnel of the Second Boer War
British Army cavalry generals of World War I